Cheng Changcheng (Chinese: 程长城; Pinyin: Chéng Chángchéng, born 27 March 1991) is a Chinese professional footballer who currently plays for Chinese Super League club Changchun Yatai.

Club career
Cheng started his professional football career in 2010 when he was promoted to Chinese Super League side Changchun Yatai's first team. He began to play for the first team in the summer of 2010 as team manager Shen Xiangfu decided to give chances to young players. On 8 August, he made his senior debut in a 1–0 home victory against Jiangsu Sainty, coming on as a substitute for Du Zhenyu in the 80th minute. Sun made 5 league appearances in the 2010 season. However, his playing time reduced in 2011 when he mainly spent his time in the reserve team league. He played 3 league matches in the 2012 season. In March 2014, Cheng moved to China League Two side Yinchuan Helanshan on a one-year loan deal. He was released by Changchun at the end of 2014 season.

On 16 April 2019, Cheng scored his first career goal in a 1-0 away win over Nantong Zhiyun in the third round of 2019 Chinese FA Cup.

On 9 October 2022, Cheng finally scored his first Chinese Super League goal in a 4-1 home defeat against Shanghai Port, 12 years after making his debut in the top division.

Career statistics
Statistics accurate as of match played 9 October 2022.

Honours

Club
Changchun Yatai
 China League One: 2020

References

External links
 

Living people
1991 births
People from Nanyang, Henan
Chinese footballers
Footballers from Henan
Changchun Yatai F.C. players
Association football forwards
Chinese Super League players
China League One players
China League Two players